Methods is a peer-reviewed scientific journal covering research on techniques in the experimental biological and medical sciences.

It absorbed two journals, ImmunoMethods and NeuroProtocols.

Abstracting and indexing 
The journal is abstracted and indexed in EMBASE, EMBiology, and Scopus. According to the Journal Citation Reports, the journal has a 2021 impact factor of 4.647.

References

External links 
 

Biochemistry journals
English-language journals
Elsevier academic journals
Publications established in 1990
Research methods journals